The Kenai Peninsula wolf (Canis lupus alces), also known as the Kenai Peninsula grey wolf, is an extinct subspecies of the gray wolf that lived on the Kenai Peninsula in southern Alaska.

Taxonomy
The subspecies was classified in 1941 as one of the four in Alaska by Edward Alphonso Goldman. It is recognized as a subspecies of Canis lupus in the taxonomic authority Mammal Species of the World (2005).

History
Wolves were common on the Peninsula before 1900, however, gold was discovered there in 1895. Miners, fearing rabies, commenced poisoning, hunting and trapping the wolves and by 1915 they had been extirpated. The Kenai Peninsula wolf was officially declared extinct in 1925.

Re-population of wolves from other areas onto the peninsula did not occur until the 1960s. It has been shown through DNA studies that, at minimum, the current population of wolves on the Kenai Peninsula mated with other Alaskan subspecies, as the structure of the current wolf population's DNA is similar to other mainland Alaskan subspecies.

Description
The Kenai Peninsula wolf was dependent on the very large moose of the region and Goldman proposed that its large size was an adaption to this.

Smithsonian Institution has a skull specimen of the Kenai Peninsula wolf, it numbered is USNM 147471.

References

Wolves
Extinct mammals of North America
Endemic fauna of Alaska
Kenai Peninsula Borough, Alaska
Mammal extinctions since 1500
Extinct animals of the United States
Wolves in the United States
Extinct canines
Subspecies of Canis lupus
Mammals described in 1941
Taxa named by Edward Alphonso Goldman
Species made extinct by deliberate extirpation efforts

fr:Canis lupus alces